Paul James may refer to:

 Paul James (academic) (born 1958), professor and writer on globalization and social theory
 Paul James (actor) (born 1981), American actor
 Paul James (basketball) (born 1964), British professional basketball player and coach
 Paul James (Canadian musician) (born 1951), blues guitarist
 Paul James (gardener), host of American television program Gardening by the Yard
 Paul James (rugby union) (born 1982), Wales international rugby union player
 Paul James (soccer) (born 1963), Canadian association football (soccer) player and coach
 Paul James (sportscaster) (1931–2018), American sports announcer
 Paul James, a pen name used by American banker James Warburg (1896–1969) when writing songs with his wife, Kay Swift
 Paul James, British writer; creator of the comedy character Constance, Lady Crabtree
 Paul Moon James (1780–1854), English banker and lawyer